List of Kazan city's mayors:

Voivodes (Tsardom of Russia)

Mayors (Russian Empire)

Civil War and Soviet era

Russian Federation 
 Rafik Gumerov (1991–1993; Chairman of City Council)
 Kamil Iskhakov (1991–1993 — City administration head; 1993–2005 — Mayor)
 Ilsur Metshin,  — Mayor

References 

Kazan